Maggie Helwig (born 1961) is a Canadian poet, novelist, social justice activist, and Anglican priest.

Academic career
Her early education was at Kingston Collegiate and Vocational Institute in Kingston, Ontario, graduating in 1979, then at Trent University in Peterborough, Ontario, where she graduated with honours with a Bachelor of Arts degree in 1983.

After reading for a Master of Divinity degree and serving as co-Head of Divinity at Trinity College, Toronto, she was ordained to the transitional diaconate in the Anglican Church of Canada at St. Paul's, Bloor Street, Toronto on 1 May 2011, and subsequently to the priesthood on 22 January 2012. On 27 November 2021, she was appointed an honorary Canon of St James' Cathedral, Toronto.

Bibliography
Helwig's second novel, Between Mountains, is a love story about a London-based Canadian journalist and a Serbian Albanian interpreter from Paris that endures the hardships that occurred during the war. The novel juxtaposes love and war within the characters while bringing about justice and truth.

Her third novel, Girls Fall Down, 2008, was shortlisted for the 2009 Toronto Book Awards.
Jason McBride, writing in Toronto Life, described it as being "smart, suspenseful and compassionate." Finally, in a book review by Greg Doran, the novel is described as the narrator having a significant relationship with the "urban environment and the human spirit."

She has also co-edited many anthologies of Canadian fiction and poetry, with collaborators including Bronwen Wallace, Douglas Glover, Mark Anthony Jarman and her father, David Helwig.

Activism
Helwig has been involved in social activist groups such as TAPOL, the East Timor Alert Network, and the International Federation for East Timor which campaigned against the Indonesian occupation of East Timor. She has also worked with the
Women in Black network, particularly during the Balkan wars of the 1990s. She was also a well known advocate for Toronto's branch of the Occupy Wall Street movement, and was one of three clergy from different denominations ticketed for setting up a chapel at the Occupy Toronto "re-occupation" camp on May 1, 2012.

Works

Poetry
 Walking Through Fire, 1981
 Tongues of Men and Angels, 1985
 Eden, 1987
 Because the Gunman, 1987
 Talking Prophet Blues, 1989
 Graffiti for J.J. Harper, 1991
 Eating Glass, 1994
 The City on Wednesday, 1996
 One Building In the Earth: New and Selected Poems, 2002

Fiction
 Gravity Lets You Down, 1997 (short fiction)
 Where She Was Standing, 2001
 Between Mountains, 2004
 Girls Fall Down, 2008

Essays
 Apocalypse Jazz, 1993
 Real Bodies, 2002

See also
 Canadian literature
 Canadian poetry
 List of Canadian poets

References

External links
 

1961 births
20th-century Canadian novelists
20th-century Canadian poets
20th-century Canadian women writers
21st-century Canadian novelists
21st-century Canadian poets
21st-century Canadian women writers
Activists from Ontario
Anglo-Catholic clergy
Anglo-Catholic writers
Canadian Anglican priests
Canadian Anglo-Catholics
Canadian human rights activists
Women human rights activists
Canadian women activists
Canadian women novelists
Canadian women poets
Living people
New Democratic Party people
People associated with Greenpeace
People from Wallasey
Trent University alumni
Trinity College (Canada) alumni
Writers from Kingston, Ontario
Writers from Toronto